Claysville is an unincorporated community in Clay County, Missouri, United States.

Claysville is named after Kentucky statesman Henry Clay.

References

Unincorporated communities in Clay County, Missouri
Unincorporated communities in Missouri